The 1920–21 Indiana State Sycamores men's basketball team represented Indiana State University during the 1920–21 college men's basketball season. The head coach was Birch Bayh, Sr, coaching the Fightin' Teachers in his third season. The team played their home games at North Hall in Terre Haute, Indiana.

This season marked the second season Indiana State recorded "double-digit" wins and marked the first season they program recorded 15 or more wins.

Schedule

|-

References

Indiana State Sycamores men's basketball seasons
Indiana State
Indiana State
Indiana State